The Rowell–Sirois Commission officially known as the Royal Commission on Dominion–Provincial Relations was a Canadian Royal Commission looking into the Canadian economy and federal–provincial relations. It was called in 1937 and reported in 1940.

The Commission was chaired first by Newton Rowell and then by Joseph Sirois. James McGregor Stewart acted as chief counsel. It was called as a result of the Great Depression. The attempts to manage the Depression by the government illustrated grave flaws with the Canadian constitution. While the federal government had most of the revenue gathering powers, the provinces had unexpectedly greater expenditure responsibilities. The founders had given the provinces responsibility for health care, education, and welfare when these were only minor concerns; by 1937, however, these had all become massive expenditure areas.

The Commission recommended that the federal government take over control of unemployment insurance and pensions. It also recommended the creation of equalization payments and large transfers of money from the federal government to the province each year. Other recommendations were not adopted due to resistance from the provinces or the federal government.

Further reading

External links
 Index to Federal Royal Commissions
 Royal Commission on Dominion-Provincial Relations

Royal commissions in Canada
Canada in the World Wars and Interwar Years
Constitution of Canada
Constitutional commissions
Great Depression in Canada
1937 in Canada
1940 in Canada